Presidential elections were held in Transnistria on 12 December 2021 with early voting starting on 6 December 2021. Two candidates were able to register to participate in the elections — incumbent president Vadim Krasnoselsky, and Sergey Pynzar, who came in second in 2016.

President Vadim Krasnoselsky was reelected with a margin so important that the results, that were expected to be announced the following day on 13 December 2021, were announced in the evening. Voter turnout was very low, but not low enough to invalidate the results of the election.

Candidates 
Vadim Krasnoselsky, winner of the 2016 election and incumbent President, ran for re-election. He was opposed by Sergey Pynzar, a farmer and lawmaker of the Grigoriopol district legislature.

Conduct 
Only election observers from Russia monitored the election. Moldova requested that other nations not observe the elections because it might legitimize Transnistria's disputed status.

Measures to facilitate voter turnout were taken following the very poor turnout to the September 2021 Russian legislative elections in which two-thirds of Tranistrian citizens had the right to vote, as they hold Russian passports. Early voting was put in place on election week.

Results
Turnout was significantly lower than in the 2016 elections.  However, the 25% threshold below which elections are not deemed valid was thus averted.

International reactions
 – The Ministry of Foreign Affairs of Romania declared that it did not recognize the elections in Transnistria and that it supported a long-lasting and peaceful resolution of the Transnistria conflict and Moldova's territorial integrity.

References

Elections in Transnistria
Transnistria
2021 in Transnistria